The 2016–17 season was Al Ain Football Club's 43rd in existence and the club's 41st consecutive season in the top-level football league in the UAE.

Club

Technical staff
{| class="wikitable"
|-
! style="color:#FFFFFF; background: #7300E6; border:2px solid #AB9767;"|Position
! style="color:#FFFFFF; background: #7300E6; border:2px solid #AB9767;"|Name
|-
|Head coach
| Zlatko Dalić
|-
|Assistant coach
| Borimir Perković Anel Karabeg
|-
|Fitness coach
| Frano Leko
|-
|Goalkeeping coach	
| David Rouse
|-
|Club doctor	
|  Jurica Rakic
|-
|Physiotherapist	
| Ivica Orsolic Marin Polonijo  Bozo Sinkovic  Abdul Nasser Al Juhani
|-
|Nutritionist
| Mohsen Belhoz
|-
|U-21 team head coach
| Joško Španjić
|-
|Team Manager
| Matar Obaid Al Sahbani
|-
|Team Supervisor
| Mohammed Obeid Hammad
|-
|Team Administrator	
| Essam Abdulla
|-
|Director of football
| Sultan Rashed

Board of directors

Goalscorers

Includes all competitive matches. The list is sorted alphabetically by surname when total goals are equal.

Disciplinary record

|-

Assists

Hat-tricks

Clean sheets

References

External links
 Al Ain FC official website 

2016–17
Emirati football clubs 2016–17 seasons